d'Lëtzebuerger Land is a weekly newspaper published in Luxembourg. It is in German, French and Luxembourgish.

History and profile
d'Lëtzebuerger Land was established in 1954. The founders were a group of financiers.

The newspaper received €259,954 in annual state press subsidy in 2009.

In 2004 the circulation of d'Lëtzebuerger Land was 7,000 copies.

Footnotes

External links
  d'Lëtzebuerger Land official website

1954 establishments in Luxembourg
Publications established in 1954
Weekly newspapers published in Luxembourg
German-language newspapers published in Luxembourg
French-language newspapers published in Luxembourg
Luxembourgish-language newspapers